Musical Youth Theatre Company was an English youth theatre company founded in 1987 in Bath, Somerset in the South West of England.

Founded by Greg Vere, it existed for fifteen years until 2002 and produced a number of shows and notable members. Musical Youth Theatre Company's final production was a version of Mike Leigh's play, Abigail's Party in July 2002.

Notable members 
Over the years Musical Youth Theatre Company had a number of members who are now notable actors, including:

Andrew Lincoln who went on to become an actor, known for his roles in the BBC television drama series This Life (as Egg) and Teachers. He also played the role of Mark in the film Love Actually.

Indira Varma who has had a number television and film roles, including  Kama Sutra: A Tale of Love in 1996 and  Bride and Prejudice in 2004, and the young Roman wife Niobe during the first season of BBC/HBO's historical drama series Rome.

Will Thorp went on to appear in the BBC medical drama series Casualty and also appeared in the third series of Strictly Come Dancing in 2005.

Jennifer Biddall, who rose to fame playing Jessica Harris in the Channel 4 soap opera Hollyoaks from 2005 to 2008.

Richard Cambridge is known for playing Pete Webster in the Channel 4 soap opera Hollyoaks

Adam Campbell who moved to the United States after graduating from university and who is known for his roles in the American film parodies Date Movie and Epic Movie.

Tabitha Wady is best known for playing Katrina Bullen in the BBC soap opera Doctors.

Ella Smith made her television debut in an episode of the BBC Medical drama series Holby City in 2006. In 2007, she played Jezebel Ogilvie in Channel 4's Cape Wrath. She also created the title role in the English presentation of Neil Labute's  'Fat Pig' at the Trafalgar Studios, then transferring to the Comedy Theatre. She also plays a role in St Trinians 2.

Tom Payne made his television debut in Waterloo Road, he filmed ITV's version of the classic Bronte novel 'Wuthering Heights', alongside Andrew Lincoln and also the title role for a drama documentary based on the life of the young George Best for the BBC. He is currently appearing in the wildly successful show The Walking Dead for AMC.

Sarah Lane (actress) Following training at Guildford, she joined the cast of 'Les Misérables' and played the role of 'Cossette'

Productions
Company productions and appearances included:

1987
September - Cabaret
1988
January - "The Weekend Starts Here" on HTV
February - First Charity Gala at the Theatre Royal, Bath
May - Jesus Christ Superstar
November - Salad Days
1989
May - The Wiz
November - Little Shop of Horrors
December - Sounds Familiar concert
1990
February - Second Charity Gala at the Theatre Royal, Bath
May - Billy
September West Side Story
November - A Taste of Music dinner cabaret
1991
January - Third Charity Gala at the Theatre Royal, Bath
April - Amadeus
July - An American Dream cabaret
October - South Pacific
December - Ultimate Christmas Party cabaret
1992
February - GWR Night Out cabaret
June - High Society
1993
January - Mother Goose
April - April in Paris cabaret
July - One Flew Over the Cuckoo's Nest
1994
January Fourth Charity Gala at the Theatre Royal, Bath
June - Magical Musicals 1 cabaret
July - Billy
October - Blue Remembered Hills
October - Magical Musicals 2 cabaret
1995
January - Fifth Charity Gala at the Forum, Bath
March - Stags and Hens
June - BBC National Lottery Live with Darren Day
July - Opening Ceremony of the 1995 European Youth Olympic Festival in Bath
July - A Chorus Line
1996
January - The Old Woman Who Lived In The Shoe
April - Whose Life Is It Anyway?
May - Music Hall at Bath Fringe Festival
June - Four Steps to Broadway cabaret
July Miss Saigon at Stourhead
October - The Anniversary
1997
January - Sixth Charity Gala at the Theatre Royal, Bath
June - Hot Mikado
July - Wild in The West at Stourhead
October - Rope
1998
January - Hansel and Gretel
April - Sweeney Todd: The Demon Barber of Fleet Street
July - Stourhead by The Sea
October - Charley's Aunt
1999
February - Cinderella
May - Romeo and Juliet
July - La belle époque at Stourhead
2000
January - Seventh Charity Gala at the Theatre Royal, Bath
July - The Importance of Being Earnest
2001
January - Blues in the Night
July - Dracula
2002
May - Cabaret
Jul 02 Abigail's Party
2006
April - Keith Butterworths 60th Cabaret

References

Encore Northenders Theatre Company
Zenith Youth Theatre Company who perform musical theatre in Bath

Performing groups established in 1987
Youth theatre companies